This Is Fats is a 1958 studio album by American rock and roll pianist Fats Domino, released on Imperial Records.

Reception
In Boys' Life, Bob Hood recommended this album for Domino being "the most unbeatable character". The New Rolling Stone Album Guide scores this release alongside all of Domino's Imperial albums as 4.5 out of five stars.

Track listing
All songs written by Dave Bartholomew and Fats Domino, except where noted.

Side one:
"The Big Beat" – 2:00
"I'll Be Glad When You're Dead You Rascal You" (Sam Theard) – 2:35
"What Will I Tell My Heart" (Jack Lawrence and Peter Tinturin) – 2:35
"Barrel House" – 2:32
"Little Mary" – 1:59
"Sick and Tired" (Bartholomew, Domino, and Chris Kenner) – 2:32
Side two:
"I Want You to Know" – 1:59
"'44'" – 2:30
"Mardi Gras in New Orleans (Henry Roeland Byrd) – 2:15
"I Can't Go On" – 2:05
"Long Lonesome Journey" (Domino and Theodore R. Jarrett) – 2:24
"Young School Girl" – 1:55

References

External links

Review by George Starostin

1958 albums
Fats Domino albums
Imperial Records albums